Djemah is a town and sub-prefecture in the Haut-Mbomou Prefecture of the south-eastern Central African Republic. It is the least-populous sub-prefecture in the country.

The town is named after local chief Djemah, who was accused of murder by French colonial officials and executed in Bangui in 1914.

References

Sub-prefectures of the Central African Republic
Populated places in Haut-Mbomou